Sir Charles Peers (1661 – 29 January 1737) was a British businessman who became the Chairman of the East India Company in 1714 and Lord Mayor of London in 1715. He had previously served as one of the Sheriffs of the City of London in 1708–1709.

Biography
Peers was born to Edmund Peers (d. 1681) and Mary Walden, in 1661, of the parish of the St. Katherine Creechurch, Aldgate ward, London. He started his career as a salter (trader of salt) and also as the London partner of William Morley and Company of Málaga, merchants and importers. He later became Common Councilman for Aldgate Ward 1701–8, and Alderman of Tower Ward 1708–37.

He was a Director of the Bank of England in 1705-07 and 1708–12, a Director  of the New East India Company in 1701-05 and 1706–09 and a Director of the United East India Company in 1712-15. He was Chairman of the latter for 1714-15.

He was knighted on 16 July 1707. He served as a Sheriff of the City of London (1708–1709) and as Lord Mayor of London (1715–16).

See also
 List of Lord Mayors of London

References

External links
 Portrait of Sir Charles Peers, Lord Mayor of London at BBC

1661 births
1737 deaths
People from Aldgate
British businesspeople
Directors of the British East India Company
Sheriffs of the City of London
18th-century lord mayors of London
Knights Bachelor